Ákos Kriza (10 February 1965 − 18 January 2021) was a Hungarian politician. Kriza was a member of Fidesz and served as mayor of Miskolc from 3 October 2010 to 13 October 2019.

Biography
Kriza was born in Oradea, Romania. He studied medicine at the University of Medicine and Pharmacy in Târgu Mureș and economics at the University of West Hungary. He received his medical degree in 1990 and moved to Miskolc the same year. He worked in the Diósgyőr Hospital then as a general practitioner until 1999 when he became a hospital manager. He joined Fidesz in 1997 and ran for mayor in 2006 when he was defeated by the incumbent mayor, Sándor Káli. After his party's landslide victory in the parliamentary elections in April 2010, he was elected mayor during the local elections held in the autumn, defeating Sándor Káli. Kriza was re-elected mayor during 2014 local elections, obtaining 42.27 percent of the vote and defeating opposition candidates Albert Pásztor, a former top police official, and Péter Jakab.

On 9 August 2019, Kriza announced he was not seeking re-election due to his long-standing tumor disease. The government party Fidesz nominated Zoltán Alakszai, the notary of Miskolc as their nominee for the position of mayor. Alakszai was defeated by local school headmaster and joint opposition candidate Pál Veres in the 2019 local elections.

Personal life
He was married to Zsuzsanna László. They have a daughter, Anna, and a son, Áron.

Ákos Kriza died on 18 January 2021, at the age of 55, after a long-term illness.

References

External links
 

1965 births
2021 deaths
People from Oradea
Mayors of places in Hungary
Fidesz politicians